Isselburg is a town in the district of Borken, in North Rhine-Westphalia, Germany. It is located on the river Issel, near the border of the Netherlands, and approximately 10 km west of Bocholt.

Division
The largest villages are Anholt, Isselburg, and Werth.  Smaller communities include Vehlingen, Herzebocholt and Heelden.

Local council (Stadtrat)

Elections in May 2014:
 SPD: 9 seats (-2)
 CDU: 11 seats (+1)
 Alliance 90/The Greens: 3 seats (±0)
 FDP: 3 seats (+1)

Mayors

Church at Anholt
St. Pankratius at Anholt (built 1851 – 1862)

Gallery

References

Borken (district)